The Heckler & Koch MP5 is a 9x19mm Parabellum submachine gun, developed in the 1960s by a team of engineers from the German small arms manufacturer Heckler & Koch. There are over 100 variants and clones of the MP5, including some semi-automatic versions.

The MP5 is one of the most widely used submachine guns in the world, having been adopted by over forty nations and numerous military, law enforcement, intelligence, and security organizations.

In 1999, Heckler & Koch developed the UMP, the MP5's successor. Despite its higher cost, the MP5 remained the more successful of the two options.

History
Heckler & Koch, encouraged by the success of the G3 automatic rifle, developed a family of small arms consisting of four types of firearms all based on a common G3 design layout and operating principle.  The first type was chambered for 7.62×51mm NATO, the second for the 7.62×39mm M43 round, the third for the intermediate 5.56×45mm NATO caliber, and the fourth type for the 9×19mm Parabellum pistol cartridge. The MP5 was created within the fourth group of firearms and was initially known as the HK54.

Work on the MP5 began in 1964 and two years later it was adopted by the German Federal Police, border guard and army special forces, referring to as the "MP64" or later "MP5". The MP5A1 was introduced in the late '60s, which is the first model to have the iconic ring front sight and the slimline handguard. In 1970, the MP5A2 and MP5A3 was introduced. In 1974, the MP5SD was introduced, which is a suppressed variant of the MP5. It was used in the Vietnam War in 1975 by the Green Berets. In 1976, the MP5K was introduced as a request for a variant for South America. In 1977, the standard 20 & 30 round, curved steel magazines were introduced for the MP5A2 and MP5A3 design. In 1978, the Tropical forearm was introduced to be produced with the MP5.

In 1980, the MP5 achieved iconic status as a result of British special forces regiment the SAS when they stormed the Iranian Embassy in London, live on television, rescuing hostages and killing five terrorists during Operation Nimrod.

The MP5 has become a mainstay of SWAT units of law enforcement agencies in the United States since then. However, in the late 1990s, as a result of the North Hollywood shootout, police special response teams replaced most MP5s with AR-15-based rifles.

The MP5 is manufactured under license in several nations including Greece (formerly at EBO – Hellenic Arms Industry, currently at ΕΑΣ – Hellenic Defense Systems), Iran (Defense Industries Organization), Mexico (SEDENA), Pakistan (Pakistan Ordnance Factories), Saudi Arabia, Sudan (Military Industry Corporation), Turkey (MKEK), and the United Kingdom (initially at Royal Ordnance, later diverted to Heckler & Koch Great Britain).

Design details 
The primary version of the MP5 family is the MP5A2, which is a lightweight, air-cooled, selective fire delayed blowback operated 9×19mm Parabellum weapon with a roller-delayed bolt. It fires from a closed bolt (bolt forward) position.

The fixed, free floating, cold hammer-forged barrel has 6 right-hand grooves with a 1 in 250 mm (1:10 in) rifling twist rate and is pressed and pinned into the receiver.

Features 

The first MP5 models used a double-column straight box magazine, but since 1977, slightly curved, steel magazines are used with a 15-round capacity (weighing 0.12 kg) or a 30-round capacity (0.17 kg empty).

The adjustable iron sights (closed type) consist of a rotating rear diopter drum and a front post installed in a hooded ring. The rear sight drum provides four apertures of varying diameters used to adjust the diopter system, according to the user's preference and tactical situation. Changing between apertures does not change the point of impact down range.

The MP5 has a hammer firing mechanism. The trigger group is housed inside an interchangeable polymer trigger module (with an integrated pistol grip) and equipped with a three-position fire mode selector that serves as the manual safety toggle. The "S" or Sicher position in white denotes weapon safe, "E" or Einzelfeuer in red represents single fire, and "F" or Feuerstoß (also marked in red) designates continuous fire. The SEF symbols appear on both sides of the plastic trigger group. The selector lever is actuated with the thumb of the shooting hand and is located only on the left side of the original SEF trigger group or on both sides of the ambidextrous trigger groups. The safety/selector is rotated into the various firing settings or safety position by depressing the tail end of the lever. Tactile clicks (stops) are present at each position to provide a positive stop and prevent inadvertent rotation. The "safe" setting disables the trigger by blocking the hammer release with a solid section of the safety axle located inside the trigger housing.

The non-reciprocating cocking handle is located above the handguard and protrudes from the cocking handle tube at approximately a 45° angle. This rigid control is attached to a tubular piece within the cocking lever housing called the cocking lever support, which in turn makes contact with the forward extension of the bolt group. It is not however connected to the bolt carrier and therefore cannot be used as a forward assist to fully seat the bolt group. The cocking handle is held in a forward position by a spring detent located in the front end of the cocking lever support which engages in the cocking lever housing. The lever is locked back by pulling it fully to the rear and rotating it slightly clockwise where it can be hooked into an indent in the cocking lever tube.

Operating mechanism 

The bolt rigidly engages the barrel extension—a cylindrical component welded to the receiver into which the barrel is pinned. The delay mechanism is of the same design as that used in the G3 rifle. The two-part bolt consists of a bolt head with rollers and a bolt carrier. The heavier bolt carrier lies up against the bolt head when the weapon is ready to fire and inclined planes on the front locking piece lie between the rollers and force them out into recesses in the barrel extension.

When fired, expanding propellant gases produced from the burning powder in the cartridge exert rearward pressure on the bolt head transferred through the base of the cartridge case as it is propelled out of the chamber. A portion of this force is transmitted through the rollers projecting from the bolt head, which are cammed inward against the inclined flanks of the locking recesses in the barrel extension and to the angled shoulders of the locking piece. The selected angles of the recesses and the incline on the locking piece produce a velocity ratio of about 4:1 between the bolt carrier and the bolt head. This results in a calculated delay, allowing the projectile to exit the barrel and gas pressure to drop to a safe level before the case is extracted from the chamber.

The delay results from the amount of time it takes for enough recoil energy to be transferred through to the bolt carrier in a sufficient quantity for it to be driven to the rear against the force of inertia of the bolt carrier and the forward pressure exerted against the bolt by the recoil spring. As the rollers are forced inward they displace the locking piece and propel the bolt carrier to the rear. The bolt carrier's rearward velocity is four times that of the bolt head since the cartridge remains in the chamber for a short period of time during the initial recoil impulse. After the bolt carrier has travelled rearward 4 mm, the locking piece is withdrawn fully from the bolt head and the rollers are compressed into the bolt head. Only once the locking rollers are fully cammed into the bolt head can the entire bolt group continue its rearward movement in the receiver, breaking the seal in the chamber and continuing the feeding cycle.

Since the 9×19mm Parabellum cartridge is relatively low powered, the bolt does not have an anti-bounce device like the G3, but instead the bolt carrier contains  of tungsten granules that prevent the bolt group from bouncing back after impacting the barrel extension. The weapon has a fluted chamber that enhances extraction reliability by bleeding gases backwards into the shallow flutes running along the length of the chamber to prevent the cartridge case from expanding and sticking to the chamber walls (since the bolt is opened under relatively high barrel pressure). A spring extractor is installed inside the bolt head and holds the case securely until it strikes the ejector arm and is thrown out of the ejection port to the right of the receiver. The lever-type ejector is located inside the trigger housing (activated by the movement of the recoiling bolt).

Accessories 
In the early 1970s, HK introduced a conversion kit for the MP5 that enables it to use rimfire ammunition (.22 LR). This unit consists of a barrel insert, a bolt group and two 20-round magazines. This modification reduces the cyclic rate to 650 rounds/min. It was sold mostly to law enforcement agencies as a way to train recruits on handling the MP5. It used ammunition that was cheaper and had a lower recoil than 9×19mm Parabellum. This reduced training costs and built up skill and confidence in the operators before transitioning them to the full-bore model.

Barrel accessories

Threading is provided at the muzzle to work with certain muzzle devices made by Heckler & Koch, including: a slotted flash suppressor, blank firing attachment (marked with a red-painted band denoting use with blank ammunition only), an adapter for launching rifle grenades (for use with rifle-style grenades with an inside diameter of 22 mm using a special grenade launching cartridge) and a cup-type attachment used to launch tear gas grenades. An optional three-lugged barrel is also available for mounting a quick-detachable suppressor.

Receiver
The receiver housing has a proprietary claw-rail mounting system that permits the attachment of a standard Heckler & Koch quick-detachable scope mount (also used with the G3, HK33 and G3SG/1). It can be used to mount daytime optical sights (telescopic 4×24), night sights, reflex sights and laser pointers. The mount features two spring-actuated bolts, positioned along the base of the mount, which exert pressure on the receiver to hold the mount in the same position at all times assuring zero retention. All versions of the quick-detachable scope mount provide a sighting tunnel through the mount so that the shooter can continue to use the fixed iron sights with the scope mount attached to the top of the receiver.

A Picatinny rail adapter can be placed on top that locks into the claw rails. This allows the mounting of STANAG scopes and has a lower profile than the claw-rail system.

Handguard
Aftermarket replacement handguards with Picatinny rails are available. Single-rail models have a Picatinny rail along the bottom and triple-rail models have rails along the bottom and sides. They allow the mounting of accessories like flashlights, laser pointers, target designators, vertical foregrips, and bipods.

Variants 
The stockless MP5A1 has a buttcap with a sling mount for concealed carry; the MP5K series was a further development of this idea. The MP5A2 has a fixed buttstock (made of a synthetic polymer), whereas the compact MP5A3 has a retractable metal stock.

The MP5A4 (fixed stock) and MP5A5 (sliding stock) models, which were introduced in 1974, are available with four-position trigger groups. The pistol grips are straight, lacking the contoured grip and thumb groove of the MP5A1, MP5A2, and MP5A3. The selector lever stops are marked with bullet pictograms rather than letters or numbers (each symbol represents the number of bullets that will be fired when the trigger is pulled and held rearward with a full magazine inserted in the weapon) and are fully ambidextrous (the selector lever is present on each side of the trigger housing). The additional setting of the fire selector, one place before the fully automatic setting, enables a two or three-shot burst firing mode.

A variant with the last trigger group designated the MP5-N (N—Navy) was developed in 1986 for the United States Navy. This model has a collapsible stock, a tritium-illuminated front sight post and a  threaded barrel for use with a stainless steel sound suppressor made by Knight's Armament Company together with quieter subsonic ammunition. It had ambidextrous controls, a straight pistol grip, pictogram markings, and originally had a four-position selector (Safe, Semi-Auto, 3-Round Burst, Full Auto). This was replaced with a similar three-position ambidextrous selector after an improperly-reassembled trigger group spontaneously fired during an exercise. The "Navy"-style ambidextrous trigger group later became standard, replacing the classic "SEF" trigger group.

In late 2013, Heckler & Koch unveiled the MLI (Mid Life Improvement) version of the MP5. It is fitted with a tri-rail foregrip, a quick-release-optic mount, an MP5F stock standard, and comes in with the new RAL8000 (Yellow-Brown) colour scheme.

MP5 
 HK54: The original model that was produced in 1964. The 54 designation is from the Heckler & Koch company's old system that indicates that it is a submachine gun/assault carbine (5-) chambered for the 9×19mm cartridge (-4). It had a charcoal-gray phosphated finish rather than the matte-black lacquered finish used on later models and had narrow slotted metal handguards. Its major differences were that it had a longer and heavier bolt carrier than the MP5 and a flip up "ladder"-style rear sight (like the early G3 rifle) rather than the MP5's aperture sight. Its original 15- or 30-round steel magazines were straight rather than curved, had a plastic follower, and were reinforced with ribs (thus their nickname of "waffle"-type magazines).
 MP5: A slightly modified version of the HK54 first created in 1966. A matte-black lacquered finish instead of the greyish phosphated finish was introduced for export models in 1977. It originally had the narrow checkered metal "Slimline" handguards in the place of the HK54's narrow slotted metal ones. These were later replaced by the thicker "Tropical" handguards in 1978. The proprietary Heckler & Koch "claw mount" rails for mounting optical and electronic scopes were added around 1973. The improved 15- and 30-round magazines were adopted in 1977; they were curved, had unribbed sides, and had chromed-steel followers.
MP5A1: No buttstock (endplate/receiver cap in place of buttstock), "SEF" trigger group.
 MP5A2: Fixed buttstock, "SEF" trigger group.
 MP5SFA2: Fixed buttstock, single-fire (SE) trigger group.
 MP5A3: Retractable buttstock, "SEF" trigger group.
 MP5SFA3: Semi-automatic carbine version of MP5A3. Retractable buttstock and single-fire (SE) trigger group.
 MP5A4: Fixed buttstock, 3-round burst trigger group.
 MP5A5: Retractable buttstock, 3-round burst trigger group.
 MP5-N: Model developed specifically for the U.S. Navy. Ambidextrous "Navy" trigger group, 3-lug/threaded barrel for attaching a sound suppressor; rubber-padded retractable stock.
 MP5F: Model developed in 1999 specifically for the French military. Rubber-padded retractable stock, ambidextrous sling loops/bolts and internal modifications to handle high-pressure ammunition.

Training variants 
H&K offers dedicated training variants of these weapons, designated MP5A4PT and MP5A5PT (PT—Plastic Training), modified to fire a plastic 9×19mm PT training cartridge produced by Dynamit Nobel of Germany. These weapons operate like the standard MP5 but have a floating chamber and both rollers have been omitted from the bolt to function properly when firing the lighter plastic projectiles. To help identify these weapons blue dots were painted on their cocking handles and additional lettering provided. The PT variant can be configured with various buttstocks and trigger groups and was developed for the West German Police and Border Guard.

MP5SF 
The MP5SFA2 (SF – single-fire) was developed in 1986 in response to the American FBI solicitation for a "9 mm Single-fire Carbine". It is the same as the MP5A2 but is fitted with an ambidextrous semi-automatic only trigger group. The MP5SFA3 is similar except it has a retractable metal stock like the MP5A3. Versions delivered after December 1991 are assembled with select-fire bolt carriers allowing fully automatic operation when used with the appropriate trigger module.

The semi-automatic "MP5SF" models are widely used by British police forces including London's  Metropolitan Police Service Specialist Firearms Command, Diplomatic Protection Group, authorised firearms officers, and the Police Service of Northern Ireland to name a few.

The two-position trigger unit was also used in the semi-automatic HK94 carbine that was produced specifically for the civilian market with a  barrel.

MP5SD 
In 1974, H&K initiated design work on a sound-suppressed variant of the MP5, designated the MP5SD (SD—Schalldämpfer, German for "sound suppressor"), which features an integral but detachable aluminium sound suppressor and a lightweight bolt. The weapon's  barrel has 30  ports drilled forward of the chamber through which escaping gases are diverted to the surrounding sealed tubular casing that is screwed onto threading on the barrel's external surface just prior to the ported segment. The suppressor itself is divided into two stages; the initial segment surrounding the ported barrel serves as an expansion chamber for the propellant gases, reducing gas pressure to slow down the acceleration of the projectile. The second, decompression stage occupies the remaining length of the suppressor tube and contains a stamped metal helix separator with several compartments which increase the gas volume and decrease its temperature, deflecting the gases as they exit the muzzle, so muffling the exit report. The bullet leaves the muzzle at subsonic velocity, so it does not generate a sonic shock wave in flight. As a result of reducing the barrel's length and venting propellant gases into the suppressor, the bullet's muzzle velocity was lowered anywhere from 16% to 26% (depending on the ammunition used) while maintaining the weapon's automation and reliability. The weapon was designed to be used with standard supersonic ammunition with the suppressor on at all times.

The MP5SD is produced exclusively by H&K in several versions: the MP5SD1 and MP5SD4 (both have a receiver end cap instead of a buttstock), MP5SD2 and MP5SD5 (equipped with a fixed synthetic buttstock) and the MP5SD3 and MP5SD6 (fitted with a collapsible metal stock). The MP5SD1, MP5SD2 and MP5SD3 use a standard 'SEF' trigger group (from the MP5A2 and MP5A3), while the MP5SD4, MP5SD5, and MP5SD6 use the 'Navy' trigger group—a trigger module with a mechanically limited 3-round burst mode and ambidextrous selector controls (from the MP5A4 and MP5A5). A suppressed version was produced for the U.S. Navy—designated the MP5SD-N, which is a version of the MP5SD3 with a retractable metal stock, front sight post with tritium-illuminated dot and a stainless steel suppressor. This model has a modified cocking handle support to account for the slightly larger outside diameter of the suppressor. The design of the suppressor allows the weapon to be fired with water inside, should water enter the device during operation in or near water.

 MP5SD: An MP5 model with an integrated suppressor (Schalldämpfer) created in 1974.
 MP5SD1: No buttstock (endplate/receiver cap in place of buttstock), "SEF" trigger group, integrated suppressor
 MP5SD2: Fixed buttstock, "SEF" trigger group, integrated suppressor.
 MP5SD3: Retractable buttstock, "SEF" trigger group, integrated suppressor.
 MP5SD4: No buttstock (endplate/receiver cap in place of buttstock), 3-round burst trigger group, integrated suppressor.
 MP5SD5: Fixed buttstock, 3-round burst trigger group, integrated suppressor.
 MP5SD6: Retractable buttstock, 3-round burst trigger group, integrated suppressor.
 MP5SD-N1: Fixed buttstock, "Navy" trigger group, KAC stainless steel suppressor.
 MP5SD-N2: Retractable buttstock, "Navy" trigger group, KAC stainless steel suppressor.

MP5K 
In 1976, a shortened submachine gun version of the MP5A2 was introduced; the MP5K (K from the German word Kurz = "short") was designed for close quarters battle use by clandestine operations and special services. The MP5K does not have a shoulder stock (the receiver end was covered with a flat end cap, featuring a buffer on the inside and a sling loop on the outside), and the bolt and receiver were shortened at the rear. The resultant lighter bolt led to a higher rate of fire than the standard MP5 at around 900 rounds per minute. The barrel, cocking handle and its cover were shortened and a vertical foregrip was used to replace the standard handguard. The barrel ends at the base of the front sight, which prevents the use of any sort of muzzle device.

The MP5K is produced (by Heckler & Koch and under license in Iran and Turkey) in four different versions: the MP5K, MP5KA4, MP5KA1, MP5KA5, where the first two variants have adjustable, open-type iron sights (with a notched rotary drum), and the two remaining variants – fixed open sights; however, the front sight post was changed and a notch was cut into the receiver top cover. The MP5K retained the capability to use optical sights through the use of an adapter.

A civilian semiautomatic derivative of the MP5K known as the SP89 was produced that had a foregrip with a muzzle guard in place of the vertical grip.

In 1991, a further variant of the MP5K was developed, designated the MP5K-PDW (PDW—Personal Defense Weapon) that retained the compact dimensions of the MP5K but restored the fire handling characteristics of the full-size MP5A2. The MP5K-PDW uses a side-folding synthetic shoulder stock (made by the U.S. company Choate Machine and Tool), a "Navy" trigger group, a front sight post with a built-in tritium insert and a slightly lengthened threaded, three-lug barrel (analogous to the MP5-N). The stock can be removed and replaced with a receiver endplate; a rotary drum with apertures from the MP5A2 can also be used.

 MP5K: Short (kurz) version created in 1976. It has a shortened  barrel, shorter trigger group frame, and a vertical foregrip rather than a handguard. There are no MP5KA2 or MP5KA3 models because it does not come with a fixed or retractable stock.
 MP5K Prototype: A stockless, cut-down MP5A2 with regular iron sights and an open vertical foregrip. It was created in 1976.
 MP5KA1: MP5K with smooth upper surface and small low-profile iron sights; "SEF" trigger group.
 MP5KA4: MP5K with regular iron sights; four-position 3-round burst trigger group.
 MP5KA5: MP5K with smooth upper surface and small low-profile iron sights; four-position 3-round burst trigger group.
 MP5K-N: MP5K with "Navy" trigger group and 3-lug/threaded barrel for mounting suppressors or other muzzle attachments.
 MP5K-PDW: Personal Defense Weapon; MP5K-N variant introduced in 1991 for issue to special operations aircraft or vehicle crews. It adds a Choate side-folding stock, 5-inch 3-lug barrel for mounting a quick-detachable Qual-A-Tec suppressor, and an ambidextrous 4-position trigger group with a 3-round burst mode. A shoulder cross-draw or thigh quick-draw holster is available.
MP5K Operational Briefcase: MP5K mounted with a STANAG claw mount inside a plastic hard shell Special Briefcase (Spezialkoffer), with an external trigger mounted in the briefcase handgrip. An earlier version called the Special Bag (Spezialtasche) included a large opening in the rear of a soft side leather case to grasp the pistol grip and manually actuate the trigger. The briefcase was sold preconfigured with the MP5K as well as separately.

MP5/10 and MP5/40 

In 1992, Heckler & Koch introduced the MP5/10 (chambered in 10mm Auto) and MP5/40 (chambered for the .40 S&W cartridge), which are based on the MP5A4 and MP5A5. These weapons were assembled in fixed and retractable stock configurations (without a separate designation) and are fed from translucent 30-round polymer box magazines. These weapons include a bolt hold-open device, which captures the bolt group in its rear position after expending the last cartridge from the magazine. The bolt is then released by pressing a lever positioned on the left side of the receiver. Both weapons use a barrel with 6 right-hand grooves and a 380 mm (1:15 in) twist rate, and like the MP5-N, both have a 3-lugged muzzle device and a tritium-illuminated front sight aiming dot.

Problems with the MP5/10 and MP5/40 led to their discontinuation in 2000, although Heckler & Koch continues to provide support and spare parts.
 MP5/10: Chambered in 10mm Auto, available in various stock/trigger group configurations. It was produced from 1992 to 2000.
 MP5/40: Chambered in .40 S&W, available in various stock/trigger group configurations. It was produced from 1992 to 2000.

Civilian variants 
 HK94: American import model of the MP5 with an exposed 16.54-inch [420mm] barrel and special SF (safe/semi-automatic) trigger group, designed for civilian use. The 94 factory designation code indicates that it is a semi-auto only Sporting Rifle (9-) chambered for the 9x19mm Parabellum cartridge (-4). A barrel-mounted vertical foregrip and a ventilated barrel shroud were available for the stock HK94. The HK94 was imported from 1983 to 1989, in three different configurations:
The HK94A2 had a fixed stock, an overall length of 34.59 inches [829 mm], and weighed 6.43 lbs. [2.92 kg.]. In 1991, the state of California imported 420 HK-94A2s, mostly for their state Department of Corrections; it was the last batch of HK-94s imported into the United States.
The HK94A3 had a retractable stock, an overall length of 27.58 inches [700 mm] collapsed and 34.05 inches [865 mm] extended and weighed 7.18 lbs. [3.26 kg].
The HK94/SG-1 (Scharfschützengewehr, "sharp-shooting rifle") was designed for short-range sniping in built-up areas like cities or prisons. It proved to be unsuitable for its designed purpose, due to its poor penetration and stopping power, and most went to target shooters and collectors. It had a fixed match stock with a rubber buttpad and an adjustable cheekpiece, folding bipod, flash hider, and a 6 × 42mm Leupold VIII Adjustable Objective scope. It had an overall length of 40.39 inches [1026mm] and a weight of 9.25 lbs. [4.2 kg]. Its mean standard retail price (MSRP) in 1986 was US$1,525; this was more than twice what a stock HK94A2 (US$650) or HK94A3 (US$720) cost. Only 50 were imported into the United States; authentic models have serial numbers running in the 43XX range.As an aftermarket modification, a PSG-1 trigger pack with target pistol grip and match trigger could be added by a gunsmith by changing the ejector and hammer spring. The 6× Leupold scope was calibrated for .223 Remington rounds, so other scopes were often substituted.
 SP89: Sportpistole M1989. Semi-automatic only version of the MP5K designed for civilian use. It lacked a vertical foregrip to make it compliant with the National Firearms Act. It was made from 1989 to 1994.
 SP5K: First introduced in 2016, the SP5K is an updated version of the SP89. It features a Picatinny rail mounted on the top of the receiver for mounting accessories. As with the SP89, it is semi-automatic only and the forward handguard does not have a vertical foregrip.
SP5: Introduced in 2019, the SP5 is a semi-automatic only version. With an 8.86 inch [225mm] barrel, the same length as that of the original MP5A2. It features the Navy barrel with the threaded adaptor available in the MP5K, paddle magazine release, and fluted chamber.

Manufacturers 
 : Norinco makes unlicensed copies of the MP5A4, as the NR-08 and NR-08A, and the MP5A5, as the CS/LS3.
 : Manufactured under licence by MAS as the MP5F.
 : Manufactured under licence by EAS (Ellinika Amyntika Systimata: "Hellenic Defence Systems").
 : Indian Ordnance Factory makes unlicensed copies of MP5A3, known as the OFB Anamika 9mm.
 : Manufactured under licence by DIO as the Tondar (MP5A3) and Tondar Light (MP5K).
 : manufactured by Luxembourg Defence Technology using POF-made parts
 : Manufactured under licence by SEDENA.
 : Manufactured under licence by Pakistan Ordnance Factories as the MP5P and also POF-5.
 : Manufactured under licence by Al Kharj Arsenal, Military Industries Corporation.
 : Manufactured by Military Industry Corporation as the Tihraga (MP5A3), a clone of the Iranian Tondar.
 : Manufactured under licence by Brügger & Thomet.
 : Manufactured by MKEK. Their trigger groups are marked: E (Safe), T (Semi-Auto) and S (Full Auto) instead of SEF.
 : Manufactured under licence by Royal Small Arms Factory – Enfield.

Users

Gallery

See also
 IMI Uzi
 Scorpion Evo 
 PP-19 Vityaz
 Colt M635
 Daewoo Telecom K7
 SIG MPX
 CS/LS7
 FAMAE SAF

References

Bibliography

External links 

 

 2008 Heckler & Koch Military and LE brochure
 HKPRO: MP5, MP5K, MP5SD, MP5/10 & MP5/40
 REMTEK: MP5, MP5K, MP5K PDW, MP5SD, MP5/10
 HECKLER & KOCH MP5 SUB MACHINE GUN FAMILY OPERATOR'S MANUAL
 HK MP5 Armorers Manual

.40 S&W submachine guns
9mm Parabellum submachine guns
10mm Auto submachine guns
Cold War weapons of Germany
MP5
Personal defense weapons
Silenced firearms
Carbines
Police weapons
Roller-delayed blowback firearms
Weapons and ammunition introduced in 1966